The 23rd PMPC Star Awards for TV ceremony was held at the PAGCOR Grand Theater in Paranaque City on November 29, 2009 and broadcast over ABS-CBN Channel 2. The ceremony was hosted by Piolo Pascual, Carmina Villaroel and John Lloyd Cruz.

Awards and Nominees
These are the nominations for the 23rd Star Awards for Television. The winners are in bold.

Best TV station 
ABS-CBN-2
NBN-4
TV5
GMA-7
RPN-9
Q-11
IBC-13
Studio 23
Net 25
UNTV-37

Best Primetime TV Series 
Codename: Asero (GMA 7)
Eva Fonda (ABS-CBN 2)
Iisa Pa Lamang (ABS-CBN 2)
Kahit Isang Saglit (ABS-CBN 2)
Luna Mystika (GMA 7)
May Bukas Pa (ABS-CBN 2)
Tayong Dalawa (ABS-CBN 2)

Best Daytime Drama Series 
Ligaw na Bulaklak (ABS-CBN 2)
Pieta (ABS-CBN 2)
Precious Hearts Romances Presents: Bud Brothers (ABS-CBN 2)
Sine Novela Presents: Saan Darating Ang Umaga? (GMA 7)

Best Drama Mini-Series 
SRO Cinemaserye Presents: Ganti (GMA 7)
SRO Cinemaserye Presents: Suspetsa (GMA 7)
Your Song Presents: Boystown (ABS-CBN 2)
Your Song Presents: My Only Hope (ABS-CBN 2)
Your Song Presents: Someone Like You (ABS-CBN 2)

Best Drama Actor 
Gerald Anderson (Your Song Presents: My Only Hope / ABS-CBN 2)
Christopher de Leon (Kahit Isang Saglit / ABS-CBN 2)
Baron Geisler (SRO Cinemaserye Presents: Suspetsa / GMA 7)
Coco Martin (Tayong Dalawa / ABS-CBN 2)
Albert Martinez (May Bukas Pa / ABS-CBN 2)
Diether Ocampo (Iisa Pa Lamang / ABS-CBN 2)
Jericho Rosales (Kahit Isang Saglit / ABS-CBN 2)

Best Drama Actress 
Claudine Barretto (Iisa Pa Lamang / ABS-CBN 2)
Agot Isidro (Tayong Dalawa / ABS-CBN 2)
Angel Locsin (Only You / ABS-CBN 2)
Angelica Panganiban (Iisa Pa Lamang / ABS-CBN 2)
Gina Pareño (Tayong Dalawa / ABS-CBN 2)
Cherry Pie Picache (Iisa Pa Lamang / ABS-CBN 2)
Cristine Reyes (Eva Fonda / ABS-CBN 2)

Best Drama Anthology 
Maalaala Mo Kaya (ABS-CBN 2)
Maynila (GMA 7)
Obra (GMA 7)

Best Single Performance by an Actress 
Gina Alajar (Obra Presents: JC de Vera / GMA 7)
Gretchen Barretto (Maalaala Mo Kaya: Salamin / ABS-CBN 2)
Alessandra de Rossi (Maalaala Mo Kaya: Pedicab / ABS-CBN 2)
Sunshine Dizon (Obra Presents: Sunshine Dizon / GMA 7)
Judy Ann Santos (Maalaala Mo Kaya: Lason / ABS-CBN 2)
Lorna Tolentino (Maalaala Mo Kaya: Chess / ABS-CBN 2)
Carmina Villaroel (Maalaala Mo Kaya: Reseta / ABS-CBN 2)

Best Single Performance by an Actor 
John Lloyd Cruz (Maalaala Mo Kaya: Pedicab / ABS-CBN 2)
JC de Vera (Obra Presents: Pretty Boy / GMA 7)
Vice Ganda (Maalaala Mo Kaya: Bola / ABS-CBN 2)
Joross Gamboa (Maalaala Mo Kaya: Bisikleta / ABS-CBN 2)
Richard Gomez (Obra Presents: Bayaran / GMA 7)
Albert Martinez (Maalaala Mo Kaya: Bisikleta / ABS-CBN 2)
Diether Ocampo (Maalaala Mo Kaya: Lambat / ABS-CBN 2)
John Wayne Sace (Maalaala Mo Kaya: Chess / ABS-CBN 2)

Best New Male TV Personality 
JR de Guzman (Midnight DJ / TV5)
Zyrus Desamparado (Lipgloss / TV5)
Zaijian Jaranilla (May Bukas Pa / ABS-CBN 2)
Xian Lim (Your Song Presents: My Only Hope / ABS-CBN 2)
Guji Lorenzana (Precious Hearts Romance Presents: Bud Brothers / ABS-CBN 2)
Jose Sarasola (Only You / ABS-CBN 2)
JC Tiuseco (Unang Hirit / GMA 7)

Best New Female TV Personality 
Patani Daño (Ful Haus / GMA 7)
Maritoni Francisco (Kiddie Kwela / TV5)
Schinina Juban (Fashionistas By Heart / Q 11)
Cheska Ortega (Lipgloss / TV5)
Queenie Padilla (Totoy Bato / GMA 7)
Maricar Reyes (Precious Hearts Romance Presents Presents: Bud Brothers / ABS-CBN 2)
Carmen Soo (Kahit Isang Saglit / ABS-CBN 2)

Best Gag Show 
Banana Split (ABS-CBN 2)
Bubble Gang (GMA 7)
Goin' Bulilit (ABS-CBN 2)
Lokomoko High (TV5)
Nuts Entertainment (GMA 7)
Wow Mali (TV5)

Best Comedy Show 
Everybody Hapi (TV5)
Ful Haus (GMA 7)
Parekoy (ABS-CBN 2)

Best Comedy Actor 
Ogie Alcasid (Bubble Gang / GMA 7)
Joey de Leon (Nuts Entertainment / GMA 7)
Jayson Gainza (Banana Split, ABS-CBN 2)
Pooh (Banana Split / ABS-CBN 2)
Vic Sotto (Ful Haus / GMA 7)
Michael V. (Bubble Gang / GMA 7)

Best Comedy Actress 
Eugene Domingo (Everybody Hapi / TV5)
Alex Gonzaga (Everybody Hapi / TV5)
Angelica Panganiban (Banana Split / ABS-CBN 2)
Pokwang (Banana Split / ABS-CBN 2)
Rufa Mae Quinto (Bubble Gang / GMA 7)
Sharlene San Pedro (Goin’ Bulilit / ABS-CBN 2)

Best Musical Variety Show 
ASAP '08 (ABS-CBN 2)
SOP Rules (GMA 7)
Walang Tulugan with the Master Showman (GMA 7)

Best Female TV Host 
Julia Clarete (Eat Bulaga / GMA 7)
Valerie Concepcion (Wowowee / ABS-CBN 2)
Toni Gonzaga (ASAP '08 / ABS-CBN 2)
Pia Guanio (Eat Bulaga / GMA 7)
Regine Velasquez (SOP Rules / GMA 7)

Best Male TV Host 
Ogie Alcasid (SOP Rules / GMA 7)
Allan K. (Eat Bulaga / GMA 7)
Luis Manzano (ASAP '08 / ABS-CBN 2)
German Moreno (Walang Tulugan with the Master Showman / GMA 7)
Vic Sotto (Eat Bulaga / GMA 7)

Best Public Service Program 
Bitag Live (UNTV 37)
Imbestigador (GMA 7)
Reunions (Q 11)
Wish Ko Lang (GMA 7)
Wonder Mom (ABS-CBN 2)
XXX: Exklusibong, Explosibong, Exposé (ABS-CBN 2)

Best Public Service Program Host 
Julius Babao, Henry Omaga-Diaz, and Pinky Webb (XXX: Exklusibong, Explosibong, Exposé / ABS-CBN 2)
Karen Davila (Wonder Mom / ABS-CBN 2)
Mike Enriquez (Imbestigador / GMA 7)
Vicky Morales (Wish Ko Lang / GMA 7)
Jessica Soho (Reunions / Q 11)
Ben Tulfo (Bitag Live / UNTV 37)

Best Horror-Fantasy Program 
Komiks Presents: Dragonna (ABS-CBN 2)
Komiks Presents: Flash Bomba (ABS-CBN 2)
Komiks Presents: Nasaan Ka Maruja? (ABS-CBN 2)
Komiks Presents: Tiny Tony (ABS-CBN 2)
Komiks Presents: Varga (ABS-CBN 2)
Midnight DJ (TV5)

Best Reality Program 
Dare Duo (Q 11)
Day Off (Q 11)
OMG! (TV5)
Pinoy Records (GMA 7)

Best Reality Program Host 
Ryan Agoncillo (Pinoy Fear Factor / ABS-CBN 2)
Paolo Bediones (Survivor Philippines / GMA 7)
Billy Crawford, Nikki Gil and Toni Gonzaga (Pinoy Dream Academy Season 2 / ABS-CBN 2)
Marc Nelson and Rovilson Fernandez (Dare Duo / Q 11)
Manny Pacquiao and Chris Tiu (Pinoy Records / GMA 7)

Best Variety/Game Show 
All Star K!: The P1M Videoke Challenge (GMA 7)
Pilipinas, Game KNB? (ABS-CBN 2)
Wowowee (ABS-CBN 2)
You and Me Against the World (TV5)

Best Game Show Host 
Kris Aquino (Kapamilya: Deal or No Deal / ABS-CBN 2)
Janno Gibbs (Kakasa Ka Ba Sa Grade 5? / GMA 7)
Richard Gomez (Family Feud / GMA 7)
Allan K. and Jaya (All Star K! The P1M Videoke Challenge / GMA 7)
Edu Manzano (Pilipinas, Game KNB? / ABS-CBN 2)

Best Talent Search Program 
Shall We Dance: The Celebrity Dance Challenge (TV5)
Talentadong Pinoy (TV5)

Best Talent Search Program Host 
Ryan Agoncillo (Talentadong Pinoy / TV5)
Ogie Alcasid and Regine Velasquez (Celebrity Duets Season 2 / GMA 7) 
Jon Avila, Victor Basa, Arnel Ignacio and Lucy Torres-Gomez (Shall We Dance: The Celebrity Dance Challenge / TV5)

Best Youth Oriented Program 
Ka-Blog! (GMA 7)
Lipgloss (TV5)

Best Educational Program 
Born to Be Wild (GMA 7)
Convergence (Net 25)
Kabuhayang Swak na Swak (ABS-CBN 2)
Matanglawin (ABS-CBN 2)
Quickfire (Q 11)

Best Educational Program Host 
Kim Atienza (Matanglawin / ABS-CBN 2)
Rosebud Benitez (Quickfire / Q 11)
Paolo Contis (World Records / GMA 7)
Amy Perez and Gilbert Remulla (Kabuhayang Swak Na Swak / ABS-CBN 2)
Ferds Recio and Kiko Rustia (Born to Be Wild / GMA 7)
Bong Revilla (Kap's Amazing Stories / GMA 7)

Best Celebrity Talk Show 
Boy & Kris (ABS-CBN 2)
Ruffa & Ai (ABS-CBN 2)
Sharon (ABS-CBN 2)
Sis (GMA 7)
Spoon (Net 25)
The Sweet Life (Q 11)

Best Celebrity Talk Show Host 
Boy Abunda and Kris Aquino (Boy & Kris / ABS-CBN 2)
Sharon Cuneta (Sharon / ABS-CBN 2)
Janice de Belen (Spoon / Net 25)
Janice de Belen, Gelli de Belen and Carmina Villaroel (Sis / GMA 7)
Ai-Ai de las Alas and Ruffa Gutierrez (Ruffa & Ai / ABS-CBN 2)
Wilma Doesnt and Lucy Torres-Gomez (The Sweet Life / Q 11)

Best Documentary Program 
The Correspondents (ABS-CBN 2)
I Survived (ABS-CBN 2)
I-Witness (GMA 7)
Kalye: Mga Kuwento ng Lansangan (ABS-CBN 2)
Reporter's Notebook (GMA 7)

Best Documentary Program Host 
Sandra Aguinaldo, Kara David, Howie Severino and Jay Taruc (I-Witness / GMA 7)
Sol Aragones, Atom Araullo and Anthony Taberna (Kalye: Mga Kuwento Ng Lansangan / ABS-CBN 2)
Karen Davila, Abner Mercado and Bernadette Sembrano (The Correspondents / ABS-CBN 2)
Jiggy Manicad and Maki Pulido (Reporter's Notebook / GMA 7)
Ces Oreña-Drilon (I Survived / ABS-CBN 2)

Best Documentary Special 
Kidnap (ABS-CBN 2)
Mega Tatlong Dekada (ABS-CBN 2)
Newsmakers (GMA 7)
Summer Sarap (GMA 7)
Walang Iwanan (ABS-CBN 2)
Walang Pera? (GMA 7)

Best Magazine Show 
Kapuso Mo, Jessica Soho (GMA 7)
Mel and Joey (GMA 7)
Moments (Net 25)
Rated K (ABS-CBN 2)
The Beat (Q 11)

Best Magazine Show Host 
Joey de Leon and Mel Tiangco (Mel and Joey / GMA 7)
Tonipet Gaba, Ivan Mayrina, Miriam Quiambao and Valerie Tan (The Beat / Q 11) 
Gladys Reyes (Moments / Net 25)
Korina Sanchez (Rated K / ABS-CBN 2)
Jessica Soho (Kapuso Mo, Jessica Soho / GMA 7)

Best News Program 
24 Oras (GMA 7)
Balitanghali (Q 11)
Bandila (ABS-CBN 2)
IBC Express Balita (IBC 13)
Saksi (GMA 7)
TEN: The Evening News (TV5)
TV Patrol Linggo (ABS-CBN 2)
TV Patrol World (ABS-CBN 2)

Best Male Newscaster 
Martin Andanar (TEN: The Evening News / TV5)
Julius Babao (TV Patrol World / ABS-CBN 2)
Ted Failon (TV Patrol World / ABS-CBN 2)
Ivan Mayrina (News On Q / Q 11)
Henry Omaga-Diaz (Bandila / ABS-CBN 2)
Alex Santos (TV Patrol Linggo / ABS-CBN 2)

Best Female Newscaster 
Karen Davila (TV Patrol World / ABS-CBN 2)
Precious Hipolito (IBC Express Balita / IBC 13)
Vicky Morales (Saksi: Liga Ng Katotohanan / GMA 7)
Ces Oreña-Drilon (Bandila / ABS-CBN 2)
Korina Sanchez (Bandila / ABS-CBN 2)
Mel Tiangco (24 Oras / GMA 7)

Best Morning Show 
Good Morning Kuya (UNTV 37)
Home Page (Net 25)
One Morning (NBN 4)
Umagang Kay Ganda (ABS-CBN 2)
Unang Hirit (GMA 7)

Best Morning Show Host 
Drew Arellano, Lyn Ching-Pascual, Arnold Clavio, Susie Entrata-Abrera, Jolina Magdangal, Winnie Monsod, Eagle Riggs, Rhea Santos and Regine Tolentino (Unang Hirit / GMA 7)
Tony Arevalo, Allan Encarnacion, Aida Gonzales, Rene Jose, Ryan Ramos and Daniel Razon (Good Morning Kuya / UNTV 37)
Kim Atienza, Winnie Cordero, Ginger Conejero, Edu Manzano, Rica Peralejo, Donita Rose, Alex Santos, Bernadette Sembrano, Anthony Taberna and Pinky Webb (Umagang Kay Ganda / ABS-CBN 2)
Aljo Bendijo, Veronica Baluyut-Jimenez, Charlene Lontoc, JM Rodriguez, Claudine Trillo and Bobby Yan (One Morning / NBN 4)
Weng dela Fuente, Eunice Mariño and Ros Olgado (Home Page / Net 25)

Best Public Affairs Program 
Harapan (ABS-CBN 2)
Probe Profiles (ABS-CBN 2)
Y Speak (Studio 23)

Best Public Affairs Program Host 
Ted Failon and Korina Sanchez (Harapan / ABS-CBN 2)
Bianca Gonzales (Y Speak / Studio 23)
Cheche Lazaro (Probe Profiles / ABS-CBN 2)

Best Showbiz Oriented Talk Show 
The Buzz (ABS-CBN 2)
Entertainment Live (ABS-CBN 2)
Juicy! (TV5)
Showbiz Central (GMA 7)
SNN: Showbiz News Ngayon (ABS-CBN 2)
Startalk (GMA 7)

Best Male Showbiz Oriented Talk Show Host 
Boy Abunda (SNN: Showbiz News Ngayon / ABS-CBN 2)
Joey de Leon (Startalk / GMA 7)
Raymond Gutierrez (Showbiz Central / GMA 7)
Luis Manzano (Entertainment Live / ABS-CBN 2)
Mo Twister (Showbiz Central / GMA 7)

Best Female Showbiz Oriented Talk Show Host 
Kris Aquino (The Buzz / ABS-CBN 2)
Toni Gonzaga (Entertainment Live / ABS-CBN 2)
Bianca Gonzales (Entertainment Live / ABS-CBN 2)
Pia Guanio (Showbiz Central / GMA 7)
Mariel Rodriguez (Entertainment Live / ABS-CBN 2)

Best Children Show 
Art Angel (GMA 7)
Batang Bibbo (GMA 7)
Kiddie Kwela (TV 5)
Kids on Q (Q 11)
Sine'skwela (ABS-CBN 2)

Best Children Show Host 
Bayani Agbayani (Kiddie Kwela / TV5)
Renford Alano, Aria Cariño, Romina de Jesus, Tonipet Gaba, Ella Guevara, David Hubalde and Sam Turingan (Kids On Q / Q 11)
Pia Arcangel, Tonipet Gaba, and Krystal Reyes (Art Angel / GMA 7)
Roxanne Barcelo (Batang Bibbo / GMA 7)
Tado Jimenez, Bombi Plata, and Shiela May Junsay (Sineskwela / Studio 23)

Best Travel Show 
Balik-Bayan (Q 11)
Bread N' Butter (UNTV 37)
Biyaheng Langit (IBC 13)
Landmarks (Net 25)
Trip na Trip (ABS-CBN 2)

Best Travel Show Host 
Drew Arellano (Balik-Bayan / Q 11)
Faye de Castro (Landmarks / Net 25)
Katherine de Castro, Jayson Gainza, Franzen Fajardo, Kian Kazemi and Uma Khouny (Trip na Trip / ABS-CBN 2)
Rodel Flordeliz, Kitt Meily and Arlene Razon (Bread N' Butter / UNTV 37)
Rey Langit (Biyaheng Langit / IBC 13)

Best Lifestyle Show 
Events Incorporated (Q 11)
Fashionistas By Heart (Q 11)
House Life (Q 11)
Life and Style (Q 11)
Urban Zone (ABS-CBN)
Us Girls (Studio 23)

Best Lifestyle Show Host 
Angel Aquino, Iya Villania and Cheska Garcia (Us Girls / Studio 23) 
Jocas de Leon, Heart Evangelista and Schinina Juban (Fashionistas By Heart / Q 11)
Sam Oh and Tim Yap (Events Incorporated / Q 11)
Daphne Oseña-Paez (Urban Zone / ABS-CBN)
Tessa Prieto-Valdes (House Life / Q 11)
Ricky Reyes (Life and Style / Q 11)

Special awards

Ading Fernando Lifetime Achievement Awardee 
Johnny Manahan

Excellence in Broadcasting Awardee 
Noli de Castro

Hall of Fame 
Eat Bulaga (GMA 7) (Best Variety Show)

Faces of the Night 
John Lloyd Cruz (Male)
Sunshine Dizon (Female)

Stars of the Night 
Piolo Pascual (Male)
Anne Curtis (Female)

See also 
PMPC Star Awards for TV

References 

PMPC Star Awards for Television